Dirk Meyer (born 9 July 1960) is a German windsurfer. He competed at the 1984 Summer Olympics and the 1988 Summer Olympics.

References

External links
 
 

1960 births
Living people
German windsurfers
German male sailors (sport)
Olympic sailors of West Germany
Sailors at the 1984 Summer Olympics – Windglider
Sailors at the 1988 Summer Olympics – Division II
Sportspeople from Berlin